Freeborn Man of the Traveling People is a folk ballad,
written by Ewan MacColl for The Travelling People, which was first
broadcast in 1964, one of eight BBC "Radio
Ballads."

It portrays the lifestyle of Ireland and Britain's nomadic people.

It has been recorded by Dick Gaughan, Liam Clancy, Christy Moore, The Johnstons, Cherish the Ladies, Bobby Clancy, Patrick Clifford, and Schooner Fare and Luke Kelly.

.

References

Songs written by Ewan MacColl
1964 songs